
Gmina Garbatka-Letnisko is a rural gmina (administrative district) in Kozienice County, Masovian Voivodeship, in east-central Poland.

Villages
Gmina Garbatka-Letnisko contains the villages and settlements of Anielin, Bąkowiec, Bogucin, Brzustów, Garbatka Długa, Garbatka Nowa, Garbatka-Dziewiątka, Garbatka-Letnisko, Garbatka-Zbyczyn, Molendy and Ponikwa.

Neighbouring gminas
Gmina Garbatka-Letnisko is bordered by the gminas of Gniewoszów, Kozienice, Pionki, Policzna and Sieciechów.

References

External links
 
 
 

Garbatka-Letnisko
Gmina Garbatka Letnisko